The following is a list of charter schools in Florida (including networks of such schools) grouped by county.

Alachua County

 Alachua Learning Center
 Boulware Springs Charter School
 Caring & Sharing Learning School
 Einstein School
 Expressions Learning Arts Academy
 Genesis Preparatory School
 Healthy Learning Academy
 Micanopy Area Cooperative School/Academy
 North Central Florida Public Charter School
 One Room School House Project
 Resilience Charter School
 SIAtech MYcroSchool

Bay County

 Bay Haven Charter Academy
 Central High School Panama City
 Chautauqua Learn & Serve Charter School
 North Bay Haven Charter School
 Palm Bay Elementary School/Prep Academy
 Rising Leaders Academy
 University Academy

Brevard County

 Educational Horizons Charter School
 Emma Jewel Charter Academy
 Imagine Schools (West Melbourne)
 Odyssey Charter School
 Palm Bay Academy Charter School
 Pineapple Cove Classical Academy
 Royal Palm Charter School
 Sculptor Charter School
 Viera Charter School

Broward County

 Academic Solutions Academy
 Advantage Academy of Math & Science Waterstone
 Alpha International Academy
 Andrews High School
 Ascend Career Academy
 Atlantic Montessori Charter School (Pembroke Pines, West)
 Avant Garde Academy Broward
 Ben Gamla Charter School (Hollywood, North, Prep, South Broward)
 Bridgeprep Academy (Broward, Hollywood Hills)
 Broward Math & Science Schools
 Central Charter School
 Championship Academy of Distinction (3 schools)
 Charter School of Excellence (2 schools)
 City of Pembroke Pines Charter Schools (4 schools)
 Coral Springs Charter School
 Eagle's Nest Charter Academy
 Everest Charter School
 Excelsior Charter Broward
 Franklin Academy (3 schools)
 Greentree Preparatory Charter School
 Hollywood Academy of Arts & Science
 Imagine Schools (Broward, North Lauderdale, Plantation, Weston)
 Innovation Charter School
 International School of Broward
 International Studies Academy
 New Life Charter Academy
 North Broward Academy of Excellence
 Panacea Prep Charter School
 Renaissance Charter School (Cooper City, Coral Springs, Pines, Plantation, University)
 RISE Academy School of Science & Technology
 Somerset Academy Inc. (Arts Conservatory, Davie, East Prep, Key, Miramar, Neighborhood, North Lauderdale, Pines, Pompano, Riverside, South, Village)
 South Broward Montessori Charter School
 Summit Academy Broward
 SunEd High School (2 schools)
 SunFire High School
 Sunshine Elementary Charter School/Paragon Academy of Technology
 West Broward Academy

Charlotte County

 Babcock Neighborhood School
 Cape Coral Charter School
 Crossroads Hope Academy
 Florida Southwestern Collegiate High School
 Six Mile Charter Academy

Citrus County
 Academy of Environmental Science

Clay County

 Clay Charter Academy
 St. Johns Classical Academy

Collier County

 Collier Charter Academy
 Gulf Coast Charter Academy (South)
 Immokalee Community School
 Marco Island Academy
 Mason Classical Academy
 Oak Creek Charter School Bonita Springs

Columbia County
 Belmont Academy

Duval County

 Biscayne High School
 Bridgeprep Academy (Duval County)
 Duval Charter Scholars Academy
 Duval Charter School (6 schools)
 Duval Mycroschool of Integrated Academics & Technologies
 Global Outreach Charter Academy
 IDEA (Bassett, River Bluff)
 KIPP Jacksonville (4 schools)
 Lone Star High School
 Pathway Academy
 River City Science Academy (5 schools)
 San Jose Schools (5 schools)
 School of Success Academy
 Seacoast Charter
 Seaside Charter (3 schools)
 Somerset Academy Inc. (Eagle)
 Tiger Academy
 Waverly Academy
 Wayman Academy of the Arts

Escambia County

 Beulah Academy of Science
 Byrneville Elementary School
 Capstone Academy
 Jackie Harris Preparatory Academy
 Pensacola Beach Charter School

Flagler County
 Imagine Schools (Town Center)

Franklin County
 Apalachicola Bay Charter School

Gadsden County
 Crossroads Academy

Glades County
 Pemayetv Emahakv Charter Elementary School

Gulf County
 North Bay Haven Charter Academy

Hernando County

 Brooksville Engineering, Science & Technology Academy
 Gulf Coast Academy of Science & Technology

Highlands County
 Four Corners Charter School

Hillsborough County

 Advantage Academy Hillsborough
 Bell Creek Academy
 Bridgeprep Academy (Riverview, Tampa)
 Brooks-DeBartolo Collegiate High School
 Channelside Academy of Math & Science
 Collaboratory Preparatory Academy
 Community Charter School of Excellence
 Dr. Kiran C. Patel High School
 East Tampa Academy
 Excelsior Prep Charter School
 Focus Academy
 Henderson Hammock Charter School
 Hillsborough Academy of Math & Science
 Horizon Charter School of Tampa
 Independence Academy
 Kid's Community College (3 schools)
 Learning Gate Community School
 Legacy Preparatory Academy
 Literacy Leadership Technology Academy
 Lutz Preparatory School
 Navigator Academy of Leadership
 New Springs Schools
 Pepin Academy
 Pivot Charter School
 Plato Academy (Tampa)
 Redlands Christian Migrant Association Leadership Academy
 Riverview Academy of Math & Science
 Seminole Heights Charter High School
 SLAM Charter
 Southshore Charter Academy
 Sunlake Academy of Math & Sciences
 Terrace Community Middle School
 Trinity School for Children
 Valrico Lake Advantage Academy
 Village of Excellence Academy
 Walton Academy
 Waterset Charter School
 West University Charter High School
 Winthrop Charter School
 Woodmont Charter School

Indian River County

 Imagine Schools (South Vero)
 Indian River Charter High School
 North County Charter School
 Sebastian Charter Junior High School
 St. Peter's Academy

Lake County

 Alee Academy Charter School
 Altoona School
 Imagine Schools (South Lake)
 Mascotte Elementary School
 Minneola Elementary Charter School
 Pinecrest Academy (Four Corners, Lakes)
 Pinecrest Academy (Tavares)
 Round Lake Elementary School
 Spring Creek Charter School

Lee County

 Bonita Springs Charter School
 Christa McAuliffe Elementary School
 City of Palms Charter High School
 Coronado High School
 Donna J. Beasley Technical Academy
 Florida Southwestern Collegiate High School (Lee)
 Gateway Charter School
 Harlem Heights Community Charter School
 The Island School
 Island Park High School
 North Nicholas High School
 Northern Palms Charter High School
 Oasis Charter School
 Palm Acres Charter High School
 Unity Charter School of Cape Coral

Leon County

 Florida State University School
 Governor's Charter School
 School of Arts & Sciences (Centre, Thomasville)
 Tallahassee Classical School
 Tallahassee School of Math & Science

Levy County

 Nature Coast Middle School
 Whispering Winds Charter School

Madison County

 James Madison Preparatory Charter High School
 Madison Creative Arts Academy

Manatee County

 Imagine Schools (Lakewood Ranch, North Manatee)
 Manatee Charter School
 Manatee School for the Arts
 Manatee School of Arts & Sciences
 Oasis Middle School
 Palmetto Charter School
 Parrish Charter Academy
 Rowlett Academy for Arts and Communication/Middle Academy
 State College of Florida Collegiate School
 Team Success
 Visible Men Academy

Marion County

 Marion Charter School
 McIntosh Area School
 Ocali Charter Middle School

Martin County

 Clark Advanced Learning Center
 Treasure Classical Academy

Miami-Dade County

 Academy of International Education Charter School
 Alpha Charter of Excellence
 Arts Academy of Excellence
 Aventura City of Excellence Charter School
 Beacon College Prep Elementary/Middle School
 Bridgeprep Academy (Greater Miami, Interamerican, North Miami Beach)
 C. G. Bethel High School
 Charter High School of the Americas
 Doctors Charter School
 Downtown Miami Charter School
 Excelsior Language Academy of Hialeah
 Gibson Charter School
 Green Springs High School
 iMater Academy Middle High School
 International Studies Charter High School/Virtual Academy
 Integrated Science & Asian Culture Academy
 KIPP Liberty City
 Lincoln-Marti Charter School Miami
 Mater Academy Charter School (Biscayne, East, Grove, iMater, International Academy, International Studies, Miami Beach, Mount Sinai, Prep)
 Miami Arts Charter School
 Miami Children's Museum Charter School
 Miami Community Charter School (Elementary, Middle, High)
 North Park High School
 Phoenix Academy of Excellence
 Seed School of Miami
 Somerset Academy Inc. (Gables, South Miami)
 Sports Leadership & Management Charter School Miami
 Sports Leadership School of Excellence
 Stellar Leadership Academy

Monroe County

 Big Pine Academy
 May Sands Montessori School
 Ocean Studies Charter School
 Sigsbee Charter School
 Somerset Academy Inc. (Island Prep)
 Treasure Village Montessori Charter School

Okaloosa County

 Collegiate High School at Northwest Florida State College
 Destin High School
 Liza Jackson Preparatory School
 Okaloosa Academy

Orange County

 Access Charter School
 Aloma Charter High School
 Aspire Charter Academy
 Bridgeprep Academy (Orange County)
 Central Florida Leadership Academy
 Chancery Charter High School
 Cornerstone Academy/High School
 Econ River Charter High School
 Hope Charter School
 Innovations Middle School
 Innovation Montessori Ocoee
 Kid's Community College (Ocoee)
 Lake Eola Charter School
 Legacy Charter High School
 Legends Academy
 Lucious and Emma Nixon Academy Charter School (L.E.N.A)
 Nap Ford Community School 
 Oakland Avenue Charter School 
 Orange County Preparatory Academy
 Orlando Science Charter School
 Passport Charter School
 Pinecrest Academy (Avalon, Creek, Prep)
 Princeton House Elementary Charter School
 Prosperitas Leadership Academy High School
 Renaissance Charter School (Chickasaw, Crown Point, Goldenrod, Hunter's Creek)
 Sheeler Charter High School
 Sunshine Charter High School
 UCP Charter School (Downtown, East Orange, Pine Hills, Transitional, West Orange)
 Workforce Advantage Academy

Osceola County

 American Classical Charter Academy St. Cloud
 Bellalago Charter Academy
 Bridgeprep Academy (Osceola, St. Cloud)
 Creative Inspiration Journey School
 Florida Cyber Charter Academy
 Four Corners Charter School
 Kissimmee Charter Academy
 Lincoln-Marti Charter School Osceola
 Main Street High School
 Mater Academy Charter School (Brighton Lakes, Palms, Prep High School, St. Cloud)
 New Dimensions High School
 Osceola Science Charter School
 P. M. Wells Charter Academy
 Renaissance Charter School (Boggy Creek, Poinciana, Tapestry)
 Sports Leadership & Management Charter School Osceola
 St. Cloud Preparatory Academy
 UCP Charter School (Osceola)
 Victory School

Palm Beach County

 Academy for Positive Learning
 Believers Academy
 Ben Gamla Charter School (Palm Beach)
 Bridgeprep Academy (Palm Beach)
 Bright Future Academy Charter School
 Connections Education Center of the Palm Beaches
 Education Venture Charter School
 Els Center of Excellence
 Everglades Preparatory Academy
 Florida Futures Academy (North)
 Franklin Academy Charter School
 Gardens School of Technology Arts
 Glades Academy Elementary School
 G-Star School of the Arts
 Gulfstream Goodwill Transition to Life Academy
 Imagine Schools (Chancellor)
 Inlet Grove Community High School
 Montessori Academy of Early Enrichment
 Olympus International Academy
 Palm Beach Maritime Academy
 Palm Beach Preparatory Charter Academy
 Potentials Charter School
 Quantum High School
 Renaissance Charter School (Central Palm, Cypress, Palms West, Summit, Wellington, West Palm Beach)
 Seagull Academy
 Somerset Academy Inc. (Boca East, Boca Middle, Canyons Middle/High, JFK, Lakes, Wellington)
 South Tech Academy
 Southtech Success Center
 Sports Leadership & Management Charter School (Boca, Palm Beach)
 Toussaint L'Ouverture High School
 University Preparatory Academy Palm Beach
 Western Academy Charter School
 Worthington High School

Pasco County

 Academy at the Farm
 Athenian Academy of Technology & the Arts
 Classical Preparatory Charter School
 Countryside Montessori Charter School 
 Dayspring Academy (Harmony, Jazz, Ovation, Symphony)
 Imagine Schools (Land O' Lakes)
 Innovation Preparatory Academy
 Learning Lodge Academy
 Pepin Academy Pasco
 Pinecrest Academy (Wesley)
 Plato Academy (Trinity)
 Union Park Charter Academy

Pinellas County

 Academie Da Vinci
 Alfred Adler School
 Athenian Academy Clearwater
 Discovery Academy of Science
 Enterprise High School
 MYcroSchool Pinellas
 NorthStar Academy of Pinellas
 Pinellas Academy of Math & Science
 Pinellas Preparatory Academy
 Pinellas Primary Academy
 Plato Academy (Clearwater, Largo, Palm Harbor, Pinellas Park, Seminole, St. Petersburg, Tarpon Springs)
 St. Petersburg Collegiate High School

Polk County

 Achievement Academy (Bartow, Lakeland, Winter Haven)
 Berkley Accelerated School
 Chain of Lakes Collegiate High School
 Compass Middle Charter School
 Cypress Junction Montessori School
 Dale R. Fair Babson Park Elementary School
 Discovery Academy/High School of Lake Alfred
 Edward W. Bok Academy
 Hartridge Academy
 Hillcrest Elementary School
 Janie Howard Wilson Elementary School
 Lake Wales Senior High School
 Lakeland Montessori School
 Language & Literacy Academy
 Magnolia Montessori Academy
 McKeel Academy of Technology
 McKeel Central Academy
 Mi Escuela Montessori School
 Navigator Academy of Leadership
 New Beginnings High School
 Polk Avenue School (3 schools)
 Polk State Lakeland Gateway School
 Ridgeview Global Studies Academy
 South McKeel Academy
 Victory Ridge Academy

Putnam County

 Children's Reading Center
 Putnam Academy of Arts & Sciences
 Putnam EDGE High School

St. Johns County

 ARC St. Johns
 Evelyn B. Hamblen Center
 St. Augustine Public Montessori School
 St. Johns Virtual School

St. Lucie County

 Palm Pointe Educational Research School (Tradition)
 Renaissance Charter School (St. Lucie, Tradition)
 Somerset Academy Inc. (College Prep, St. Lucie)

Santa Rosa County
 Learning Academy of Santa Rosa

Sarasota County

 Dreamers Academy
 Imagine Schools (North Port, Palmer Ranch)
 Island Village Montessori School
 Sarasota Academy of the Arts
 Sarasota Military Academy
 Sarasota School of Arts & Sciences
 Sarasota Suncoast Academy
 SKY Academy (Englewood, Venice)
 State College of Florida Collegiate School
 Student Leadership Academy
 Suncoast School for Innovative Studies

Seminole County

 Choices in Learning
 Elevation High School
 Galileo Gifted School
 Seminole Science Charter School

Sumter County
 The Villages Charter Schools

Volusia County

 Burns Science & Technology Charter School
 The Chiles Academy
 Easter​seals Northeast Charter School
 Ivy Hawn Charter School of the Arts
 Reading Edge Academy
 Richard Milburn Academy
 Samsula Academy

Wakulla County
 COAST Charter School of Arts, Science & Technology

Walton County

 Seaside Neighborhood School
 Walton Academy

References

Charter